Phyllonorycter japonica is a moth of the family Gracillariidae. It is known from Japan (the islands of Hokkaidō, Honshū, Kyūshū and Shikoku) and the Russian Far East.

The wingspan is 6–8 mm.

The larvae feed on Carpinus laxiflora, Carpinus tschonoskii, Corylus heterophylla, Corylus mandshurica and Ostrya japonica. They mine the leaves of their host plant. The mine has the form of a ptychonomous blotch mine on the upperside of the leaf.

References

japonica
Moths of Asia
Moths described in 1963